Caranginae is a subfamily of ray-finned fish from the family Carangidae which consists of twenty genera and 103 species.

Genera
The following genera are classified within the Caranginae:

References

 
Carangidae
Fish subfamilies
Taxa named by Constantine Samuel Rafinesque